Fife Airport  is an unlicensed aerodrome located  west of Glenrothes, Fife, Scotland. The airport is owned by Fife Airport Ltd and operated by Fly With The Best Ltd. In 1998, it was voted the best airfield in the United Kingdom by Flyer magazine.

The airfield is used by Tayside Aviation, Fife Flying Club, Skydive St Andrews, Skyhook Helicopters and Kingdom Helicopters.

In February 2021, Tayside Aviation took over the leasehold of Fife Airport under their subsidiary Fly With The Best Ltd and embarked on a major refurbishment of the airfield and its facilities. The former Tipsy Nipper restaurant was closed in late 2020 and re-opened as the Skyview café.

AVGAS 100LL and UL91 fuels are available at the airfield. 100LL is available to resident aircraft 24/7 via a self-service pump. Visitors and users of UL91 can purchase fuel during operational hours.

References

External links
Fife Airport
Tayside Aviation
Fife Flying Club
Skydive St Andrews
Skyhook Helicopters

Airports in Scotland